Mersin İdmanyurdu (also Mersin İdman Yurdu, Mersin İY, or MİY) Sports Club; located in Mersin, east Mediterranean coast of Turkey in 1997–98. Mersin İdmanyurdu (MİY) participated in Second League 1997–98 season for the 24th time.  MİY had a bad season in league and finished 6th.  The team also participated in Turkish Cup in 1997–98 and eliminated at Round 4.

H. Okan Merzeci was succeeded by Mehmet Küver as president of the club. Zafer Bilgetay was head coach at the start of the season. Kasım Gündüz completed first half of the season. In the second half Zafer Göncüler managed the team. Türkay Başaran had the most appearances, 32, while Hakan Kayalar was the league and season top goalscorer with 10 goals.

1997–98 Second League participation
Mersin İdmanyurdu took place in Group 1 in Second League 1997–98 season.  League played in three stages. In the first stage 51 teams in five groups (one with 11 and others with 10 clubs) played for first two rankings to play in promotion group.  The promotion group consisted of those 10 teams.  At the end of the second stage top two teams promoted to First League 1998–99. Remaining 8 teams in each ranking group and ninth team in 2nd group played in classification groups, by carrying points and goals from ranking groups. Bottom two teams relegated to Third League 1998–99 at the end of the season. In the third stage, 8 clubs (3 from the promotion group and 1 each from 5 classification groups) played one-leg play-off games in Eskişehir Atatürk Stadium to determine the third team to be promoted to First League.

Mersin İdmanyurdu took place in Group 1 consisted of 10 teams and finished first stage at sixth place and couldn't take a place in promotion group. In classification group, team finished 6th again and couldn't attend to promotion play-off games.

Results summary
Mersin İdmanyurdu (MİY) 1997–98 Second League season league summary:

Sources: 1997–98 Turkish Second Football League pages.

Ranking group league table
Mersin İY's league performance in TFF Second League Ranking Group 1 in 1997–98 season is shown in the following table.

Three points for a win. Rules for classification: 1) points; 2) tie-break; 3) goal difference; 4) number of goals scored. In the score columns first scores belong to MİY.
 (Q): Qualified to 1997–98 Second League Promotion Group.Source: 1997–98 Turkish Second Football League pages from TFF website, Turkish-Soccer website, and Maçkolik website.

Ranking group games
Mersin İdmanyurdu (MİY) 1997–98 Second League season first half game reports in Ranking Group 1 is shown in the following table.
Kick off times are in EET and EEST.

Sources: 1997–98 Turkish Second Football League pages.

Classification Group
Classification group 1 was played with 8 teams remaining after top two of ranking group were promoted to promotion group. Top team in the group promoted to promotion play-offs, while bottom two teams relegated to 1997–98 Third League season. Points and goals were carried from ranking group. MİY obtained 5 wins, 3 draws and 6 losses and finished sixth. Mersin İY's league performance in Second League Classification Group 1 in 1997–98 season is shown in the following table.

Three points for a win. Rules for classification: 1) points; 2) tie-break; 3) goal difference; 4) number of goals scored. In the score columns first scores belong to MİY.
 (Q): Qualified to 1997–98 Second League Promotion Play-offs;  (R): Relegated to 1998–99 Turkish Third Football League.Source: 1997–98 Turkish Second Football League pages from TFF website, Turkish-Soccer website, and Maçkolik website.

Classification group games
Mersin İdmanyurdu (MİY) 1997–98 Second League season first half game reports in Classification Group 1 is shown in the following table.
Kick off times are in EET and EEST.

Sources: 1997–98 Turkish Second Football League pages.

1997–98 Turkish Cup participation
1997–98 Turkish Cup was played by 83 teams in 6 rounds prior to quarterfinals. First five round were played in one-leg elimination system, starting from 6th round two leg elimination rounds were played. [Mersin İdmanyurdu] had participated in 36th Turkish Cup (played as Türkiye Kupası in 1997–98 from Round 2 and eliminated at Round 4. The opponents were from Second League like MİY. MİY attended to the cup starting from second round. In the second round MİY eliminated their historical rivals Adana Demirspor which  took place in 2nd League Group 2 in that season. In the third round the opponents were Group 2 runners-up Eskişehirspor. Hatayspor was the team to which MİY lost in 4th round. Beşiktaş won the cup for the 5th time.

Cup track
The drawings and results Mersin İdmanyurdu (MİY) followed in 1997–98 Turkish Cup are shown in the following table.

Note: In the above table 'Score' shows For and Against goals whether the match played at home or not.

Game details
Mersin İdmanyurdu (MİY) 1997–98 Turkish Cup game reports is shown in the following table.
Kick off times are in EET and EEST.

Source: 1997–98 Turkish Cup pages.

Management

Club management
H. Okan Merzeci, mayor of Mersin city was president of the club. However, on 20 October 1997 Merzeci died due to cerebral hemorrhage. Halil Kuriş acted as mayor while municipality official Mehmet Küver became president of the club.

Coaching team
Zafer Bilgetay was head coach at the start of the season. After presidential change, when 10the round was lost and team was eliminated from the cup, Kasım Gündüz who coached the team in previous season as well, took over the team. Zafer Göncüler came to the position before the start of the second stage and completed the season.

1997–98 Mersin İdmanyurdu head coaches:

Note: Only official games were included.

1997–98 squad
Appearances, goals and cards count for 1997–98 Second League Group 1 matches and 1997–98 Turkish Cup (Türkiye Kupası) matches only. Starting from this season, the number of players in roster were increased to 18; of the 7 substitutes 3 were eligible to be replaced. Players who only appeared in game rosters were included and listed in order of appearance.

Sources: TFF club page and maçkolik team page.

See also
 Football in Turkey
 1997–98 Turkish Second Football League
 1997–98 Turkish Cup

Notes and references

Mersin İdman Yurdu seasons
Turkish football clubs 1997–98 season